Asterolecanium coffeae or yellow fringed scale is a pit scale insect pest on coffee plants, especially Coffea arabica, throughout tropical Africa, including Angola, the Democratic Republic of Congo,  Kenya, Uganda and Tanzania.  In addition to coffee plants it feeds on jacaranda and Photinia japonica.

References

Agricultural pest insects
Insects of Africa
Insects described in 1911
Asterolecaniidae